Zeev Hershkowitz is a former Israeli footballer who played in Maccabi Jaffa and Maccabi Netanya in the 1950s and 1960s.

References

Living people
Israeli Jews
Israeli footballers
Maccabi Jaffa F.C. players
Maccabi Netanya F.C. players
Liga Leumit players
Footballers from Jaffa
Association footballers not categorized by position
Year of birth missing (living people)